Citizens Bank Building, also known as the Yancey County Public Library Building, is a historic bank building located at Burnsville, Yancey County, North Carolina. It was built in 1925, and is a three-story, yellow brick Renaissance Revival style building. The front facade features fluted Corinthian order pilasters and arched brick openings. The building housed a bank until 1972, when it was donated for use as a county library.

It was listed on the National Register of Historic Places in 1990.

References

External links
 Yancey County Public Library website

Bank buildings on the National Register of Historic Places in North Carolina
Renaissance Revival architecture in North Carolina
Commercial buildings completed in 1925
Buildings and structures in Yancey County, North Carolina
National Register of Historic Places in Yancey County, North Carolina